Gregory "Greg" Ian Ball, OAM (born 29 May 1974) is an Australian Paralympic cyclist.

Personal
Ball was born in Ipswich, Queensland on 29 May 1974, and was diagnosed with transverse myelitis.

Career

Ball first competed for Australia in 1998, winning and breaking the world record in the 1 km time trial at the World Titles in that year. He won a gold medal at the 2000 Sydney Games in the mixed Olympic Sprint LC1–3 event, for which he received a Medal of the Order of Australia. In 2002, he once again won the 1 km time trial event at the World Titles. At the 2004 Athens Games, he won two gold medals in the Men's 1 km Time Trial Bicycle LC1–4 and Men's Team Sprint LC1–4/CP 3/4 events. At the 2008 Beijing Games, he won a bronze medal in the Men's 1 km Time Trial LC3–4 event.

On 4 February 2011, he broke a world record in the C1 men's 1 km time trial at the Scody Cycling Australia Track National Championships; it was the fastest time since a change in the classification system in 2010. He voluntarily took a drug test to ensure the validation of his record, and tested positive for the banned substance stanozolol, an anabolic steroid. He was provisionally suspended on 9 March 2011, and on 26 October 2011, the Australian Sports Anti-Doping Authority (ASADA) announced that it had acknowledged the two-year ban imposed on Ball by Cycling Australia, backdated to the date of the provisional suspension. The ban prevented him from participating in the 2012 London Paralympics. He was also ordered to pay back $27,500 in grants to the Australian Sports Commission, and was stripped of his February 2011 world record. Ball said that taking the steroids was an honest mistake that had devastated him. In his submission to ASADA, he said that he had been suffering depression for the previous twelve months and admitted that he had taken "up to four tablets, the name and exact constituents of which he did not know at the time (and still does not know), obtained from a close friend"; he said that he believed the tablets were vitamins that would help him to recover from depression.

References

External links

Paralympic cyclists of Australia
Australian male cyclists
Cyclists at the 2000 Summer Paralympics
Cyclists at the 2004 Summer Paralympics
Cyclists at the 2008 Summer Paralympics
Medalists at the 2000 Summer Paralympics
Medalists at the 2004 Summer Paralympics
Medalists at the 2008 Summer Paralympics
Paralympic gold medalists for Australia
Paralympic bronze medalists for Australia
Paralympic medalists in cycling
Les Autres category Paralympic competitors
Recipients of the Medal of the Order of Australia
Cyclists from Queensland
Sportsmen from Queensland
Sportspeople from Ipswich, Queensland
Doping cases in Australian cycling
1974 births
Living people